The 1957 Uber Cup was the inaugural Uber Cup; a women's international team badminton championship promoted by Betty Uber. Eleven nations took part competing first (as in Thomas Cup competition) within zones to qualify for interzone matches. The final round was held in Lytham St Annes, Lancashire, England on 18 March 1957. The United States won the event, defeating Denmark.

Teams
Three teams qualified for the interzone stage of the competition, the United States, India, and Denmark. Denmark received a bye in the first round to go directly into the final. Originally four teams were to be represented in the interzone matches, but New Zealand which qualified from Australasia withdrew.

Qualifying round

First round

Final

Final summary
The United States and Denmark competed in the final. 7 matches were played: 
3 singles and 4 doubles (2 doubles, then reversed). Winning all three of her matches, Judy Devlin led the way to a decisive 6–1 victory for the USA.

References

Uber Cup
Thomas & Uber Cup
Uber Cup, 1957
Uber Cup